The Doubt (Spanish: La duda) is a 1972 Spanish drama film directed by Rafael Gil and starring Fernando Rey and Analía Gadé.

Cast
  Fernando Rey as Don Rodrigo - Conde de Albrit  
 Analía Gadé  as Lucrecia - Condesa de Lain  
 Ángel del Pozo  as Ricardo  
 Rafael Alonso  as Senén Corchado  
 José María Seoane as Venancio 
 Cándida Losada  as Gregoria  
 Gabriel Llopart  as Doctor Angulo  
 Pilar Bardem  as María  
 Marcelo Arroita-Jáuregui  as Don José  
 Concepción Muñoz as La Marquesa  
 Lali Romay as Dorotea 
 Inma de Santis as Leonor  
 Armando Calvo  as Prior de Zaratay

See also
 The Grandfather (1998)

References

Bibliography
 de España, Rafael. Directory of Spanish and Portuguese film-makers and films. Greenwood Press, 1994.

External links 

1972 films
1972 drama films
Spanish drama films
1970s Spanish-language films
Films based on works by Benito Pérez Galdós
Films directed by Rafael Gil
Films with screenplays by Rafael J. Salvia
1970s Spanish films